PDZ and LIM domain protein 1 is a protein that in humans is encoded by the PDLIM1 gene.

Interactions 

PDLIM1 has been shown to interact with:
 Actinin alpha 4, 
 Actinin, alpha 1, 
 Estrogen receptor alpha,  and
 RNF12.

References

Further reading